The seventh season of the sitcom Mom began on September 26, 2019 and concluded on April 16, 2020 on CBS in the United States. The season is produced by Chuck Lorre Productions and Warner Bros. Television, with series creators Chuck Lorre, Eddie Gorodetsky and Gemma Baker serving as executive producer. The season finished with 20 episodes, a reduction from the planned 22 episodes that was forced by the COVID-19 pandemic. This is the final season to feature Anna Faris as Christy, with "Big Sad Eyes and an Antique Hot Dog" becoming the show's unintended season finale/farewell episode for Faris.

Christy (Anna Faris) is still sober and has her life mostly back on track, though she's continually tested by her mother, Bonnie (Allison Janney). Together, the two work to overcome their mistakes and build a better future. Now, Christy is well on her way to becoming a lawyer, while Bonnie is in a healthy romantic relationship and has just married Adam (William Fichtner). Through it all, Christy and Bonnie rely on their support system from AA, including the wise Marjorie (Mimi Kennedy), the wealthy and sometimes misguided Jill (Jaime Pressly), the overly emotional Wendy (Beth Hall), and the loudmouth but sweet Tammy (Kristen Johnston), who was upgraded to series regular status for this season. Collectively, they help each other stay sober in the face of whatever life throws at them. The episodes are usually titled with two odd topics that are mentioned in that episode.

Season seven of Mom aired Thursdays in the United States at 9:00 p.m. after The Unicorn in the first half of the season and Man with a Plan in the second half.

Cast

Main
 Anna Faris as Christy Plunkett
 Allison Janney as Bonnie Plunkett
 Mimi Kennedy as Marjorie Armstrong-Perugian
 Jaime Pressly as Jill Kendall
 Beth Hall as Wendy Harris
 William Fichtner as Adam Janikowski
 Kristen Johnston as Tammy Diffendorf

Recurring
 Rainn Wilson as Trevor Wells
 Will Sasso as Andy
 French Stewart as Chef Rudy
 Reggie de Leon as Paul
 Lauri Johnson as Beatrice
 Chiquita Fuller as Taylor
 Charlie Robinson as Mr. Munson
 Mary Pat Gleason as Mary

Special guest stars
 Kate Micucci as Patty
 Reginald Veljohnson as Jim
 John Ratzenberger as Stan
 Paget Brewster as Veronica Stone
 Kathleen Turner as Cookie
 Peter Onorati as Wayne
 Courtney Thorne-Smith as Sam

Guest stars
 Jim Turner as Rick
 Phil Buckman as Marv
 Bernie Kopell as Ken
 Jayson Blair as DJ
 Andrew Caldwell as Todd
 Lauren Weedman as Angela
 Mario Cantone as Sean
 Kirstin Eggers as Janice
 Parisa Fakhri as Laurie
 Tim Chiou as Kevin
 Keone Young as George
 Anna Maria Horsford as Eve Ferguson
 Larry Joe Campbell as Mike
 Michelle Arthur as Belinda
 Wallace Langham as Jerry
 Jennifer Marsala as Amber
 Karen Malina White as Natalie
 Ted McGinley as Dr. Berenson
 Tracy Vilar as Lorraine
 Patricia Bethune as Wanda
 Gillian Vigman as Melanie
 Miriam Flynn as Arlene
 Carolyn Hennesy as Professor Winslow
 Isla Rose Burton as Baby Sofia
 Virginia Montero as Marta
 Amy Pietz as Rebecca

Episodes

Ratings

References

Mom (TV series)
2019 American television seasons
2020 American television seasons